Kynttiläsydän is a 1938 Finnish poetry collection by Finnish poet and translator Aale Tynni. The collection was chiefly written in 1936 and published in 1938 became her first written work.

Sources

External links
 

1938 poetry books
Finnish poetry collections